Adversarial Design is a type of political design that evokes and engages political issues. In doing so, the cultural production of Adversarial Design crosses all disciplinary boundaries in the construction of objects, interfaces, networks, spaces and events. Most importantly, Adversarial Design does the work in expressing and enabling agonism.

Origin and meaning 
The term was first used by Carl DiSalvo in his 2012 book Adversarial Design, as an attempt to provide design criticism as an approach to thinking about political expression, computation as a medium and the processes and products of design.

Characteristics
Fundamental to Adversarial Design is agonism, a condition of productive contestation and dissensus. Adversarial Design allows for spaces of agonism to flourish and provide resources and opportunities for others to participate in this contestation. As such, “Adversarial” in Adversarial Design paves the way for dissensus, contestational relations and experiences through made designed artefacts and its expression. It is therefore biased and takes divisive positions.

With agonism as foundation to Adversarial Design, these affective aspects of critique and commentary in political discourse aim to generate disagreement and confrontation that are forever ongoing and contestation that is forever looping. Adversarial Design facilitates ongoing questioning, challenging and reframing as a self-reflective mechanism for democracy to be effective.

DiSalvo also draws a distinction between Adversarial Design as political design (design for ongoing contest between force and ideals) and not design for politics, which is designed to support the means of governance. Thus, one of the characteristics of Adversarial Design is the cultivated discernment of political qualities of artefacts and systems.

Examples
Examples include:
 CCD – Me Not Umbrella by Mark Shepard (2009)
 Feral Robotic Dogs by Natalie Jeremijenko (2002)
 Machine Therapy by Kelly Dobson (2007)
 Million Dollar Blocks by SIDL (2003)
 Natural Fuse by Haque Design + Research (2009)
 Oil Standard by Michael Mandiberg (2006)
  Spore 1.1 by Douglas Easterly and Matthew Kenyon (2007)
 State-Machine:Agency by Max Carlson and Ben Cerveny (2005)
 They Rule (2001, 2004, 2011) and Exxon Secrets (2014) by Josh On
 Unfluence by Skye Bender-deMoll and Greg Michalec (2007)

See also 
 Critical design
 Tactical media

References

Sources
 Future Tense Event Recap: Evgeny Morozov on His New Book To Save Everything, Click Here Slate April 2013.
 Design Agonism Textile Toolbox

Critical design
Critical theory